The 2014–15 Ukrainian Basketball SuperLeague was the 24th edition of the Ukrainian top-tier basketball championship. The season started on October 11, 2014 and ended on May 4, 2015.

Because of the unrest in Ukraine, just 7 foreign players played in the league this season. BC Donetsk and BC Azovmash didn't participate this season.

In the regular season, Khimik took the top seed unbeaten with a 30–0 record, and eventually took the title after winning 36 games in a row.

Regular season

Standings

Results

Rounds 1-20

Rounds 21-30

Playoffs

References

Ukrainian Basketball SuperLeague seasons
1
Ukraine